Adamets is a Slavic last name derived from the given name Adam

Notable people with the last name include:
Danylo Adamets, Chairman of Executive Committee of Donetsk Oblast, Ukrainian SSR, in 1954–1956
Nikolay Adamets (1983–2014), Belarusian association football player



Russian-language surnames